This is a list of the highest paved public roads in Scotland.

See also
Extreme points of Scotland
List of highest paved roads in Europe

References
Ordnance Survey maps, 1:25000 and 1:50000
Climbbybike.com
Cols d'Ecosse

Roads in Scotland
Mountain passes of Scotland
Roads in Scotland
highest roads in Scotland
highest roads